Eudasychira is a genus of tussock moths in the family Erebidae.

Species
 Eudasychira abellii Dall'Asta, 1983
 Eudasychira amata (Hering, 1926)
 Eudasychira ampliata (Butler, 1878)
 Eudasychira anisozyga (Collenette, 1960)
 Eudasychira audeoudi (Collenette, 1939)
 Eudasychira aurantiaca (Kenrick, 1914)
 Eudasychira aureotincta (Kenrick, 1914)
 Eudasychira bokuma (Collenette, 1961)
 Eudasychira calliprepes (Collenette, 1933)
 Eudasychira demoulini Dall'Asta, 1983
 Eudasychira diaereta (Collenette, 1959)
 Eudasychira dina (Hering, 1926)
 Eudasychira enigmatica Dall'Asta, 1983
 Eudasychira errata Dall'Asta, 1983
 Eudasychira eudela (Collenette, 1954)
 Eudasychira gainsfordi Dall'Asta, 2009
 Eudasychira galactina (Mabille, 1880)
 Eudasychira geoffreyi (Bethune-Baker, 1913)
 Eudasychira georgiana (Fawcett, 1901)
 Eudasychira isozyga (Collenette, 1960)
 Eudasychira leucopsaroma (Collenette, 1959)
 Eudasychira macnultyi (Collenette, 1957)
 Eudasychira metathermes (Hampson, 1905)
 Eudasychira nadinae Dall'Asta, 1983
 Eudasychira poliotis (Hampson, 1910)
 Eudasychira proleprota (Hampson, 1905)
 Eudasychira quinquepunctata Möschler, 1887
 Eudasychira sciodes (Collenette, 1961)
 Eudasychira shabana Dall'Asta, 1983
 Eudasychira subeudela Dall'Asta, 1983
 Eudasychira sublutescens (Holland, 1893)
 Eudasychira subpolia Dall'Asta, 1983
 Eudasychira thomensis (Talbot, 1929)
 Eudasychira tshuapana Dall'Asta, 1983
 Eudasychira ultima Dall'Asta, 1983
 Eudasychira umbrensis (Bethune-Baker, 1913)
 Eudasychira unicolora Dall'Asta, 1983
 Eudasychira vuattouxi Dall'Asta, 1983

References

Lymantriinae
Moth genera